R512 road may refer to:
 R512 road (Ireland)
 R512 road (South Africa)